Laurențiu Augustin Bozeșan (22 November 1959 – 8 October 1998) was a Romanian footballer who played as a midfielder. He died at age 38 after he lost control of his truck and fell into an abyss in Germany.

International career
Laurențiu Bozeșan played three friendly games at international level for Romania. He made his debut when he came as a substitute and replaced Michael Klein in the 55th minute of a 1–1 against Israel.

Honours

Club
Politehnica Timișoara
Divizia B: 1983–84

References

External links
 
 
 

1959 births
1998 deaths
Romanian footballers
Romania international footballers
Association football midfielders
Liga I players
Liga II players
ASA Târgu Mureș (1962) players
FC Sportul Studențesc București players
FC Politehnica Timișoara players
FC Rapid București players
People from Târnăveni